Conservative or Tory government may refer to:

Canada
In Canadian politics, a Conservative government  may refer to the following governments administered by the Conservative Party of Canada or one of its historical predecessors:

 1st Canadian Ministry, the Canadian government under Sir John A. Macdonald (1867–1873)
 3rd Canadian Ministry, the Canadian government under Sir John A. Macdonald (1878–1891)
 4th Canadian Ministry, the Canadian government under Sir John Abbott (1891–1892)
 5th Canadian Ministry, the Canadian government under Sir John Sparrow David Thompson (1892–1894)
 6th Canadian Ministry, the Canadian government under Sir Mackenzie Bowell (1894–1896)
 7th Canadian Ministry, the Canadian government under Sir Charles Tupper (1896)
 9th Canadian Ministry, the Canadian government under Sir Robert Borden (1911–1917)
 10th Canadian Ministry, the Canadian government under Sir Robert Borden (1917–1920)
 11th Canadian Ministry, the Canadian government under Arthur Meighen (1920–1921)
 13th Canadian Ministry, the Canadian government under Arthur Meighen (1926)
 15th Canadian Ministry, the Canadian government under R. B. Bennett (1930–1935)
 18th Canadian Ministry, the Canadian government under John Diefenbaker (1957–1963)
 21st Canadian Ministry, the Canadian government under Joe Clark (1979–1980)
 24th Canadian Ministry, the Canadian government under Brian Mulroney (1984–1993)
 25th Canadian Ministry, the Canadian government under Kim Campbell (1993)
 28th Canadian Ministry, the Canadian government under Stephen Harper (2006–2015)

United Kingdom
In British politics before 1834, a Tory government may refer to the following governments administered by the Tories:

 Carmarthen–Halifax ministry, the British government dominated by Lord Carmarthen and Lord Halifax (1689–1690)
 Godolphin–Marlborough ministry, the British government dominated by Lord Godolphin and the Duke of Marlborough (1702–1710)
 Harley ministry, the British government dominated by Robert Harley (1710–1714)
 Bute ministry, the British government under Lord Bute (1762–1763)
 First Pitt ministry, the British government under William Pitt the Younger (1783–1801)
 Addington ministry, the British government under Henry Addington (1801–1804)
 Second Pitt ministry, the British government under William Pitt the Younger (1804–1806)
 Ministry of All the Talents, the British government under Lord Grenville (1806–1807)
 Second Portland ministry, the British government under the Duke of Portland (1807–1809)
 Perceval ministry, the British government under Spencer Perceval (1809–1812)
 Liverpool ministry, the British government under Lord Liverpool (1812–1827)
 Wellington–Peel ministry, the British government under the Duke of Wellington and Sir Robert Peel (1828–1830)

In British politics from 1834, a Conservative government may refer to the following governments administered by the Conservative Party:
 Wellington caretaker ministry, the British government under the Duke of Wellington (1834)
 First Peel ministry, the British government under Sir Robert Peel (1834–1835)
 Second Peel ministry, the British government under Sir Robert Peel (1841–1846)
 Who? Who? ministry, the British government under Lord Derby (1852)
 Second Derby–Disraeli ministry, the British government under Lord Derby and Benjamin Disraeli (1858–1859)
 Third Derby–Disraeli ministry, the British government under Lord Derby and Benjamin Disraeli respectively (1866–1868)
 Second Disraeli ministry, the British government under Lord Beaconsfield, better known as Disraeli (1874–1880)
 First Salisbury ministry, the British government under Lord Salisbury (1885–1886)
 Second Salisbury ministry, the British government under Lord Salisbury (1886–1892)
 Unionist government, 1895–1905, the British government under Lord Salisbury and Arthur Balfour respectively
 Conservative government, 1922–1924, the British government under Bonar Law and Stanley Baldwin respectively
 Second Baldwin ministry, the British government under Stanley Baldwin (1924–1929)
 National Government, several British ministries dominated by the Conservative Party
National Government (1931), the British government under Ramsay MacDonald
National Government (1931–1935), the British government under Ramsay MacDonald
National Government (1935–1937), the British government under Stanley Baldwin
National Government (1937–1939), the British government under Neville Chamberlain
Chamberlain war ministry, the British government under Neville Chamberlain (1939–1940)
 Churchill war ministry, the British government under Winston Churchill (1940–1945)
 Churchill caretaker ministry, the British government under Winston Churchill (1945)
 Third Churchill ministry, the British government under Sir Winston Churchill (1951–1955)
 Eden ministry, the British government under Sir Anthony Eden (1955–1957)
 Conservative government, 1957–1964, the British government under Harold Macmillan and Sir Alec Douglas-Home respectively
 Heath ministry, the British government under Edward Heath (1970–1974)
 First Thatcher ministry, the British government under Margaret Thatcher (1979–1983)
 Second Thatcher ministry, the British government under Margaret Thatcher (1983–1987)
 Third Thatcher ministry, the British government under Margaret Thatcher (1987–1990)
 First Major ministry, the British government under John Major (1990–1992)
 Second Major ministry, the British government under John Major (1992–1997)
 Cameron–Clegg coalition, the British government under David Cameron and Nick Clegg (2010–2015)
 Second Cameron ministry, the British government under David Cameron (2015–2016)
 First May ministry, the British government under Theresa May (2016–2017)
 Second May ministry, the British government under Theresa May (2017–2019)
 First Johnson ministry, the British government under Boris Johnson (2019)
 Second Johnson ministry, the British government under Boris Johnson (2019–2022)
 Truss ministry, the British government under Liz Truss (2022)
 Sunak ministry, the British government under Rishi Sunak (2022–present)

See also
 
 Conservative Party leadership election
 List of British governments
 List of Canadian ministries
 List of conservative parties